Letterkenny (meaning "Hillside of the O'Cannons") is a town in County Donegal, Ireland.

Letterkenny may also refer to:

 Letterkenny (TV series), Canadian comedic TV show, and the name of the fictional town in which it is set
 Letterkenny Township, Franklin County, Pennsylvania, a U.S. township named after Letterkenny in Ireland
 Letterkenny Army Depot
 Letterkenny, Ontario, an unincorporated community in the township of Brudenell, Lyndoch and Raglan in Ontario, Canada

See also
 
 
 Letter (disambiguation)
 Kenny (disambiguation)